Fertiana is a civil parish in County Tipperary, Ireland. It is part of the historical barony of Eliogarty. It has 3,397 statute acres divided into seven townlands:
Turtulla
Cabragh
Cloghmartin
Clohoge
Fertiana
Galbertstown Lower
Galbertstown Upper

References

 Fertiana